Francis Patrick Salemme (August 18, 1933 – December 13, 2022), sometimes spelled Salemmi, also known as "Cadillac Frank" and "Julian Daniel Selig", was an American mobster from Boston, Massachusetts who became a hitman and eventually the boss of the Patriarca crime family of New England before turning government witness.

Early years

Salemme became acquainted with Patriarca family mobster Anthony Morelli in 1957 while in prison. He started working with Morelli in criminal activities after getting out of prison, and he quickly gained stature in the Patriarca family as an associate – although he could not become a made man or full member. Patriarca boss Raymond Patriarca respected Salemme for his obedience to the family and his skill as a money maker, but he only allowed full-blooded Italians to become made men, and Salemme was part Irish from his mother Anne Salemme (née Haverty).

During the early 1960s, Salemme participated in the Irish gang wars in Boston. Testifying before Congress in 2003, Salemme admitted to murdering numerous rival gang members in Charlestown, Massachusetts:

The Hugheses, the McLaughlins, they were all eliminated, and I was a participant in just about all of them, planned them and did them.

In 1968, Salemme arranged the car bombing of John Fitzgerald, a lawyer representing Patriarca mob informant Joseph Barboza. The point of the attack was to scare Barboza into not testifying against Raymond Patriarca and other mob leaders. Fitzgerald survived the attack, but lost his left leg. It was later established in testimony by several witnesses and confirmed by the U.S. House of Representatives Organized Crime unit investigation that Salemme was involved in the bombing, but did not carry it out. After the unsuccessful attack, Salemme went into hiding. He remained a fugitive until 1972, when he was captured by FBI agent John Connolly in Manhattan. He was convicted and sentenced to prison for 16 years.

During the trial of retired FBI agent John Connolly, Salemme denied murdering a nightclub owner named Steven DiSarro in 1994. Two years later, however, Steve Flemmi was immunized and told U.S. attorneys Fred Wyshak and Brian Kelly that he saw Salemme participate in the murder. Salemme went back to jail when he was finished testifying against Connolly, and there he bragged to a fellow inmate that the prosecutors had coached him to commit perjury and that he had committed so much perjury that he should be sentenced to jail for a hundred years. The inmate was an informant who wrote down his confession and it is memorialized in law enforcement reports. Instead of charging Salemme with the murder of DiSarro, Wyshak and Kelly merely charged him with perjury and obstruction. A secret plea bargain was struck and he was sentenced to little more than time already served.

Mob rivalry

In 1986, family boss Jerry Angiulo had been sent to prison on racketeering charges, leaving a power vacuum in the Patriarca family. In previous years, Salemme had forged strong ties to Whitey Bulger and the mostly Irish Winter Hill Gang. Salemme was especially close to Bulger's lieutenant Steve Flemmi (who by this time had been a federal informant for ten years). In early 1989, soon after his release from prison, Salemme attempted to gain control of the Patriarca family. Patriarca caporegime Joseph Russo opposed Salemme's move, fearing the loss of his lucrative rackets. In June 1989, Angelo "Sonny" Mercurio, a Russo loyalist, lured Salemme to a meeting outside a Saugus, Massachusetts IHOP. Gunmen then ambushed Salemme, wounding him in the chest and leg. The feud between Salemme and Russo continued until John Gotti, the boss of the New York Gambino crime family, brokered a peace agreement. Under the agreement, Salemme loyalist Nicholas Bianco became boss and Russo became consigliere. By 1991 Salemme, with the support of Bulger and Flemmi, had become the de facto boss of the Patriarca family.

Sting operation

During the 1990s, at the urging of Frank Salemme, Jr., Frank, Sr. started extorting money from a film crew that wanted to avoid paying high salaries to union workers while filming in Boston and Providence, Rhode Island. As it turned out, the film crew was actually a Federal Bureau of Investigation (FBI) front. These events were highly fictionalized in the 2004 film The Last Shot. At the end of the operation, Frank, Sr. was arrested in Fort Lauderdale, Florida and charged with racketeering, crossing state lines for criminal activity, extortion, conspiracy, and loansharking.

Government informant

In January 1995, Salemme was indicted on racketeering charges along with Bulger and Flemmi. Salemme was convicted and sentenced to 11 years' imprisonment. In 1999, while serving his racketeering sentence, Salemme learned that both Bulger and Flemmi had been FBI informants for many years, and that both men had provided information on Salemme to their FBI handlers. Salemme now agreed to provide the government with information on the FBI handling of Bulger and Flemmi. Salemme's testimony would help convict Connolly, the same man who had arrested him 20 years earlier in New York, on racketeering charges.

In 2003, in return for assisting the government, Salemme was released early from prison and brought into the federal witness protection program. Shortly after his release, Salemme appeared before a Congressional committee to testify on the Connolly case.

2018 murder conviction
On June 22, 2018, Salemme was convicted of the murder of 43-year-old Steven A. DiSarro, who disappeared in May 1993. DiSarro's remains were unearthed from behind a mill-turned-apartments in Wanskuck, Providence, Rhode Island, on March 31, 2016. Patriarca mob associate William Ricci, who owned the apartment complex, faced gun and drug charges after authorities found over 1,400 marijuana plants and a stolen handgun at the property around August 2015; three weeks after a plea deal was worked out, the remains were recovered at the property. Judge Allison Burroughs sentenced Salemme and former Patriarca crime family associate and accomplice, Paul Weadick, to life in prison on September 13, 2018. According to former Winter Hill Gang member and Whitey Bulger associate, Stephen Flemmi, Salemme stood by and watched as his son strangled DiSarro while Weadick held his legs. According to authorities, Salemme believed DiSarro was informing on him after he was contacted by authorities in the investigation of Salemme's illegal activity within The Channel nightclub. Assistant U.S. Attorney Fred Wyshak said that Salemme admitted to murdering eight people during the 1960s, and was suspected of involvement in six additional murders in the early 1990s.

Salemme was latterly held at the United States Medical Center for Federal Prisoners.

Personal life and death
Salemme's namesake son, Francis "Frankie Boy" Salemme Jr, died of AIDS-related leukemia in 1995.

On December 13, 2022, Frank Salemme died at MCFP Springfield, at the age of 89.

References

External links
Boston Globe profile of Francis Salemme
Boston.com Local News Man who helped bug the mafia dead at 70
 Americanmafia.com: Mob War in Beantown II by Allan May
The Chicago Syndicate: "Cadillac Frank" Salemme Gets Five Years in Prison

 

1933 births
2022 deaths
Gangsters from Boston
People from Weymouth, Massachusetts
American gangsters of Irish descent
American gangsters
American gangsters of Italian descent
Mafia hitmen
Patriarca crime family
American crime bosses
People who entered the United States Federal Witness Protection Program
Federal Bureau of Investigation informants
Gangsters sentenced to life imprisonment